WKMO-FM (101.5 FM, "101.5 KMO") is a radio station broadcasting an Country Music format. Licensed to Hodgenville, Kentucky, United States, the station is currently owned by Elizabethtown CBC, Inc.

Previous logo

References

External links

KMO-FM
Radio stations established in 1995
1995 establishments in Kentucky
Mainstream adult contemporary radio stations in the United States